This is a list of electricity-generating power stations in Northern Ireland, sorted by type and name, with installed capacity (May 2011).

Note that the Digest of United Kingdom energy statistics (DUKES) maintains a comprehensive list of United Kingdom power stations, accessible through the Department of Energy and Climate Change here.

A red background denotes a power station that is no longer operational.

List

Joint venture with Scottish and Southern Energy

Tidal Power

Northern Ireland was home to the world's first commercially viable tidal stream generator. Trials were begun in Scotland then in England, before Marine Current Turbines installed the thousand-tonne SeaGen turbine at the mouth of Strangford Lough. The lough was chosen because it has one of the fastest tidal flows in the world. The installation went live and was connected to the grid in mid-December, 2008, injecting an extra 1.2 megawatts of electricity.

The turbine is scheduled to produce power for five years, though Marine Current Turbines were reported to have asked for an extension beyond their 2013 contract. By March 2010, the turbine had passed an operating time of over 1,000 hours - a first for any marine energy device.

Impact to the environment was closely scrutinised. The device, built in Belfast's famous Harland and Wolff shipyard, is rigged with a sonar device which stops the motion of the rotor blades when it detects marine lifeform near it. While there has been no negative affect to the environment - a special protected wildlife area - it has been noticed that porpoises stop communicating while passing the device.

See also

Northern Ireland Electricity
List of power stations in England
 List of power stations in Scotland
 List of power stations in Wales
 List of power stations in the Republic of Ireland

References

External links
 Department of Energy & Climate Change
 Digest of United Kingdom energy statistics 2011

Power stations in the United Kingdom
 
Northern Ireland
North
Lists of buildings and structures in Northern Ireland